Canastra is a type of cheese from Brazil. Its name comes from the region where it is produced, a highland known as Serra da Canastra, located in the southwest region of the Minas Gerais state. The climate, altitude, pasture and water of  this area are specific for its manufacturing and for this reason this delicacy is only made in a handful of towns, under supervised production. In 2008 the Canastra cheese was entitled an intangible cultural heritage of Brazil.

Characteristics 
The Canastra cheese is made out of raw cow's milk and has a mildly spicy, full-bodied flavour. It is found under three types of maturation: fresh, half and fully cured. The fresh stage means a four-day period and the fully cured forty days.

See also
 List of cheeses

References

External links
 Queijos no Brasil - Queijo Canastra

Brazilian cheeses